Wat Khao Bandai It is an ancient temple in Phetchaburi province, western Thailand.

It is one of most famous temples in Phetchaburi, it has a history dating back to the Sukhothai or Ayutthaya periods. Since the Ayutthaya period, such as Wat Khao Bandai It, this has been the place where Prince Si Silp (heir of King Songtham) was imprisoned for treason to King Chetthathirat. Some legends say that Wat Khao Bandai It used to be a place of meditation for old Brahmin Saeng, who was the pedagogue of King Suriyenthrathibodi (Tiger King) and believes that old Brahmin Saeng was an expert in alchemy and magic. Whenever the soldiers of Phetchaburi go out to battle, they must come and ask for sacred objects such as talismans or takrut (type of Thai sacred object) to avoid war.

Khao Bandai It offers several stunning caves such as Tham Pratham, Tham Phra Chao Suea, Tham Phra Phuttha Saiyat, Tham Duke. Interestingly, the pair of ordination halls on the west side of the mountaintop have a leaning pagoda in the middle. Legendarily, a rich man had two wives. He donated money to renovate the temple and build a pagoda with ordered his ashes to be packed in this pagoda after he died. Later, the two wives of the rich man argued about who he loved more. So they built a pair of ordination halls next to the pagoda and prayed that if the rich man loved anyone more, may the pagoda lean to that side. It turned out that he loved his mistress more. Therefore, the pagoda leans towards the east ordination hall, which was built by the mistress.

Wat Bandai It is located in the midst of a natural enclave on the outskirts of Phetchaburi town. Therefore, it is the habitat of wild monkeys.

Gallery

References 

Unregistered ancient monuments in Thailand
Buddhist temples in Phetchaburi Province
Thai Theravada Buddhist temples and monasteries